William de Ramsey (fl. 1323 – died 1349) was an English Gothic master mason and architect who worked on and likely designed the two earliest buildings of the Perpendicular style of Gothic architecture. William Ramsey was likely an inventor of the Perpendicular style which was to dominate Gothic architecture in England for three centuries "and, if so, he was one of the most influential architects England has ever produced".

The son of John de Ramsey, Master of Works at Norwich Cathedral and probable builder at Ely Cathedral (1324–30), William Ramsey began his career in the 1320s, working with his father on the cloisters at Norwich and probably on the chapel above the St Ethelbert's Gate to the cathedral close. In 1323 he was working on St Stephen's Chapel (since destroyed) at the old Palace of Westminster. He was also a consultant ('Visiting Master') at Norwich's Cathedral between 1326 and 1331. In 1332 he designed the chapter house (since destroyed) at Old St Paul's Cathedral in London. In 1337 he was consulted on the design of the presbytery of Lichfield Cathedral and was charged with supervising building at Stephen's Chapel the same year. The chapter house at St Paul's and St Stephen's in Westminster are known from existing fragments and contemporary illustrations to have been in Perpendicular style, the first buildings to have been built this way. 

In 1335 he was one of four commissioners responsible for a report on the Tower of London. The following year, he was made Chief Mason of the Tower and Chief Surveyor of the King's Works there and for all castles south of the River Trent, a lifetime appointment. The great hall and other parts of Penshurst Place (1341–48) were likely his work.

William de Ramsey was a scion of the de Ramsey family of master masons whose work, according to John Harvey, can be found at Ramsey Abbey, Norwich Cathedral, Ely Cathedral, and possibly also in Paris. Ramsey died of plague in 1349, during the Black Death. William Ramsey's daughter, Agnes Ramsey, carried on his workshop after his death.

References

Bibliography 

Year of birth missing
1349 deaths
14th-century English architects
Gothic architects
English stonemasons